Arshak (or in Western Armenian Arshag) (in Persian آرشاک) (in Armenian  Արշակ) is a Persian and Armenian given name.

People

Historic
Artaxiad dynasty of Iberia, a branch of the eponymous dynasty of Armenia, ruled Iberia (ancient Georgia) from c. 90 BC to 30 AD. 
Arshak I of Iberia, also known as Artaxias I of Iberia, king of Artaxiad dynasty, king of Iberia (modern-day Georgia) from 90 to 78 BC. He is known exclusively from the medieval Georgian chronicles which gives his name as Arshak
Arshak II of Iberia, also known as Artaxias II of Iberia, or Arsuk (died in AD 1), king of the Nimrodid Dynasty, king of Iberia (present Georgia) from c. 20 BC to AD 1.
Arshakuni Dynasty or Arsacid dynasty of Armenia, ruled the Kingdom of Armenia from 54 to 428. 
Arshak I of Armenia or Arsaces I of Armenia, king of Armenia, also known as Arsaces I, Arshak I and Arsak (flourished 1st century) (assassinated in 35 AD), a Parthian Prince of Iranian and Greek ancestry who served as a Roman Client King of Armenia in 35.
Arshak II (fl. 4th century, died 369 or 370), also known as Arsaces II and Arsak II, Armenian king, a prince who was a Roman client king of Arsacid Armenia from 350 until 368
Arshak III (fl. 4th century – died 387), also known as Arsaces III, Arsak III and Arshak III-Vagharshak, Armenian king, and prince who served as a Roman client king of Arsacid Armenia from 378 until 387.
Arsaces (son of Khosrov IV of Armenia), also known as Arshak, an Armenian Prince of the Arsacid dynasty of Armenia who lived in the second half of the 4th century and possibly first half of the 5th century.

Contemporary people

Arshak
Arshak Adamian (1884–1956), Armenian conductor, composer, art critic, pedagogue
Arshak Amiryan (born 1977), Armenian footballer
Arshak Fetvadjian (1866–1947), Ottoman-born Armenian artist, painter and designer
Arshak Gafavian better known by his nom de guerre Keri (1858–1916), Armenian fedayee military commander in the Ottoman Empire
Arshak Hayrapetyan (born 1978), Armenian freestyle wrestler
Arshak Jamalyan or Djamalian (1882–1940), Armenian politician and minister during First Republic of Armenia
Arshak Koryan (born 1995), Russian Armenian footballer
Arshak Petrosian (born 1953), Armenian chess player and coach
Arshak Sarkissian (born 1981), Armenian painter
Arshak Ter-Gukasov (1819–1881), Armenian Lieutenant-General of the Russian Empire
Arshak Vramian (1871–1915), Ottoman Armenian politician, member of the Ottoman parliament elected from Van Province, Ottoman Empire. He was killed just before the Siege of Van.

Arshag
 Arshag Chobanian (1872–1954), Ottoman born Armenian short story writer, journalist, editor, poet, translator, literary critic, playwright, philologist, and novelist
 Arshag Karagheusian (1872–1963), Armenian rug manufacturer, co-owner of A & M Karagheusian
 Arshag Nersesian (1872–1940) better known by the pseudonym Sebouh, Armenian general who was the right-hand man of General Andranik Ozanian

See also
Arsaces, classical Latinised alternative of the Armenian name Arshak
Alternative name of Asaak, an ancient city which was a capital of the Parthian Empire
Arshakid Mausoleum, or Tomb of the Arshakid Kings or Arshakuni Tomb, a grave monument complex that sits along a gorge overlooking the Amberd River, and is located in the center of the village of Aghtsk in the Aragatsotn Province of Armenia
Arshak II (opera), first Armenian classical opera, written by Dikran Tchouhadjian and T. Terzian
TCA Arshag Dickranian Armenian School, private Armenian school in Hollywood, California
Arash, common Iranian first name

Armenian masculine given names